The Ecorally San Marino – Città del Vaticano is a FIA Alternative Energies Cup event organized since 2006 by the S.M.R.O. – San Marino Racing Organization. Reserved to vehicles with alternative energy propulsion, it starts from the Republic of San Marino and goes through Central Italy to Vatican City.

Winners

References

FIA E-Rally Regularity Cup
Rally competitions in San Marino
Rally competitions in Vatican City